Aminu Mohammed (born December 15, 2001) is a Nigerian professional basketball player for the Delaware Blue Coats of the NBA G League. He played college basketball for the Georgetown Hoyas.

Early life and high school career
Mohammed grew up in Lagos, Nigeria. At age 14, he moved to the United States to attend Archbishop Carroll High School in Washington D.C. In his freshman season, Mohammed earned First Team All-Washington Catholic Athletic Conference honors, before transferring to Greenwood Laboratory School in Springfield, Missouri. As a sophomore, he averaged 34.2 points and 17.5 rebounds, leading his team to a Missouri Class 2 state title, its first state title since 1942. He was named Class 2 District 10 Player of the Year and Missouri Gatorade Player of the Year. As a junior, Mohammed averaged 34.8 points and 15.7 rebounds per game. In his senior season, he earned Mr. Show-Me Basketball, McDonald's All-American, and Jordan Brand Classic honors. Mohammed scored 2,709 points at Greenwood, the most in Springfield history.

Recruiting
Mohammed was rated a five-star recruit by 247Sports and Rivals, and a four-star recruit by ESPN. On December 21, 2020, he committed to playing college basketball for Georgetown over offers from Georgia, Indiana, Kansas State, Texas, SMU and DePaul. He became the highest-ranked player to commit to Georgetown since Isaac Copeland in 2014. Mohammed was the first five-star recruit during the tenure of head coach Patrick Ewing.

College career
Prior to the beginning of his freshman season, Mohammed was selected as the Big East Preseason Freshman of the Year. In his debut, he scored 17 points and had six rebounds in a 69–60 loss to Dartmouth. Mohammed scored a season-high 27 points and had 10 rebounds in an 88–77 loss to Creighton on February 14, 2022. As a freshman, he averaged 13.7 points, 8.2 rebounds and 1.8 assists per game. On March 31, 2022, Mohammed declared for the 2022 NBA draft while maintaining his college eligibility. He later decided to remain in the draft.

Professional career

Delaware Blue Coats (2022–present)
On November 4, 2022, Mohammed was named to the opening night roster for the Delaware Blue Coats.

Career statistics

College

|-
| style="text-align:left;"| 2021–22
| style="text-align:left;"| Georgetown
| 31 || 31 || 32.2 || .379 || .310 || .722 || 8.2 || 1.8 || 1.6 || .6 || 13.7

Personal life
Mohammed's older brother, Kabir, played college basketball for San Jacinto College before transferring to Missouri State. His former high school coach, Shawn Harmon, became his legal guardian in 2015 after taking in his brother two years earlier.

References

External links
Georgetown Hoyas bio

2001 births
Living people
McDonald's High School All-Americans
Nigerian expatriate basketball people in the United States
Nigerian men's basketball players
Georgetown Hoyas men's basketball players
Shooting guards